Georgios Iordanidis may refer to:

 Georgios Iordanidis (midfielder) (born 1989), Greek football midfielder
 Georgios Iordanidis (defender) (born 1989), Greek football manager and former defender